1944 Egypt Cup Final, was the final match of 1943–44 Egypt Cup, when Farouk (Zamalek SC now) defeated Al-Ahly by a score of 6–0, the largest winning margin in the derby and Egypt cup finals, Farouk claimed the cup for the 7th time.

Route to the final

 1 Masry withdrew protesting to play in Cairo.

Game description

Match details

References

External links
 Zamalek's 7th time Champion - 1943/1944
 Ahly Cup Final

1944
EC 1944
Al Ahly SC matches